Hotzenplotz may refer to:

 Hotzenplotz - German name of Osoblaha / Osobłoga river in Czech Republic and in Poland
 Hotzenplotz - German name of Osoblaha village in Czech Republic
 The Robber Hotzenplotz - a children's book by German author Otfried Preußler